Wrattonbully is a locality located within the Naracoorte Lucindale Council in the Limestone Coast in the south east of South Australia about  south east of the Adelaide city centre.  Wrattonbully gives its name to the wine region surrounding it, the  Wrattonbully wine region.

Wrattonbully was established following World War II in 1946 as a soldier settlement scheme. Seventeen farms were allocated to returned soldiers. The community hall was established in 1958. Wrattonbully shares a single CFS brigade with the neighbouring locality of Joanna.

Wrattonbully is located within the federal Division of Barker, the state electoral district of MacKillop, and the local government area of the Naracoorte Lucindale Council.

References
Notes

Citations

External links

Limestone Coast